The numerals and derived numbers of the Proto-Indo-European language (PIE) have been reconstructed by modern linguists based on similarities found across all Indo-European languages. The following article lists and discusses their hypothesized forms.

Cardinal numbers
The cardinal numbers are reconstructed as follows:

Other reconstructions typically differ only slightly from Beekes and Sihler. See also Fortson 2004.

Lehmann believes that the numbers greater than ten were constructed separately in the dialect groups and that  originally meant "a large number" rather than specifically "one hundred."

Gender of numerals

Numerals as prefixes
Special forms of the numerals were used as prefixes, usually to form bahuvrihis (like five-fingered in English):

Ordinal numbers
The ordinal numbers are difficult to reconstruct due to their variety in the daughter languages. The following reconstructions are tentative:

Latin primus, Russian perv-).
"second": The daughter languages use a wide range of expressions, often unrelated to the word for "two" (including Latin and English), so that no PIE form can be reconstructed. A number of languages use the form derived from *h₂enteros meaning "the other [of two]" (cf. OCS vĭtorŭ, Lithuanian añtras, Old Icelandic annarr)
"third" to "sixth" were formed from the cardinals plus the suffix :  "third" etc.
"seventh" to "tenth" were formed by adding the thematic vowel  to the cardinal:  "eighth" etc.

These and the suffix  spread to neighbouring ordinals, seen for example in Vedic  "eighth" and Lithuanian  "ninth".

Reflexes

Reflexes, or descendants of the PIE reconstructed forms in its daughter languages, include the following.

Reflexes of the cardinal numbers

In the following languages, reflexes separated by slashes mean:
 Albanian: Tosk Albanian / Gheg Albanian
 Armenian: Classical Armenian / Eastern Armenian / Western Armenian
 English: Old English / Modern English
 German: Old High German / New High German
 Irish: Old Irish / Modern Irish
 Ossetic: Iron / Digor
 Persian: Old Persian / Modern Persian
 Tocharian: Tocharian A / Tocharian B

Reflexes of the feminine numbers

Reflexes of the numeral prefixes

Reflexes of the ordinal numbers

Notes

References

Further reading
 Bammesberg, Alfred (1995). "Latin quattuor and Its Prehistory". In: Journal of Indo-European Studies (JIES) 23 (1-2): 213–222.
 Beekes, Robert S. P. (1987). "The Word for ‘Four’ in Proto-Indo-European". In: Journal of Indo-European Studies (JIES) 15 (1/2): 215–219.
 Bomhard, Allan. "Some thoughts on the Proto-Indo-European cardinal numbers". In: In Hot Pursuit of Language in Prehistory: Essays in the four fields of anthropology. In honor of Harold Crane Fleming. Edited by John D. Bengtson. John Benjamins Publishing Company, 2008. pp. 213-221. 10.1075/z.145.18bom. 

Numerals
Numerals